Haathi Mere Saathi is a 1993 Urdu-language Pakistani film. The English title is The Elephant Walk.This film was a Nigar Award winner for Best Film of the year 1993.

Cast
 Reema Khan
 'John Rambo'
 Sahiba Afzal
 Shafqat Cheema
All music is scored by Wajid Ali Nashad and the film director was Shamim Ara.

References

External links

1993 films
Pakistani comedy films
Nigar Award winners
1990s Urdu-language films
Films scored by Wajid Nashad
Urdu-language Pakistani films